Adhirangam Ranganathaswamy temple or Ranganatha Perumal Temple is a Hindu temple dedicated to Vishnu located in Adhi Thiruvarangam in the Taluk of Sankarapuram, Tamil Nadu, India. Constructed in the Dravidian style of architecture, it is believed to have been built by the Medieval Cholas and Vijayanagar  kings.

Ranganatha Perumal is believed to have appeared to king Mahabali and the Alvars at the temple's site. Six daily rituals and a dozen yearly festivals are held there, of which the chariot festival, celebrated during the Tamil month of Chittirai (March–April), is the most prominent. The temple is open from 6 am to 7:30 pm. It is maintained and administered by the Hindu Religious and Endowment Board of the Government of Tamil Nadu.

Legend

As per Hindu legend, a demon king named Somukan stole all the Vedas from the Devas and all the sages were worried. They appealed to Vishnu, who appeared as Ranganatha at this place to emerge from water to rescue the scriptures. He is also believed to have advised Brahma at this place. As per another legend, a king named Surakeerthi who was childless worshipped Vishnu at this place to get children. Chandra, the moon god, lost all his glow on account of a curse he incurred. The celestial deities advised him to worship Vishnu at this place. He established a tank and worshipped Ranganatha with the holy waters and believed to have been relieved off his curse. The temple tank, Chandra Pushkarani, is believed to be the tank he established. The celestial deities wanted Vishnu to show them his true form during a night time. Pleased by their devotion, Vishnu is believed to have appeared in Rangantha form and give darshan permanently.

Architecture 

The temple has a flat rajagopuram, the gateway tower and is surrounded by tall granite walls. The presiding deity, Ranganatha Perumal, has an imposing image measuring  made of mooligai silai(idol made with herbs) and is seen in reclining posture in the sanctum. The five headed snake Adisesha is sported as an umbrella for the presiding deity made of stucco. The sanctum also houses the image of Sridevi near his head and Bhudevi near his foot. The festival deity, Rangarajan along with his consorts Sridevi and Bhudevi are also housed in the sanctum. There is a mace made of silver located near the arm and the image of Garuda seen in praying posture is located near the foot of the presiding deity. The images of Alvars are housed in the hall preceding the sanctum. The central shrine is approached from the gopuram axially through a four pillared mani mandapam and pillared halls of mukha mandapam and artha mandapam. The shrine of Ranganayaki, the consort of Ranganathar is located in a shrine parallel to the sanctum. The temple has a historical grain storage container made of brick located in the south east corner of the temple. The granary is one of its kind as in other temples like Srirangam, Jambukeswarar Temple at Tiruvanaikaval and Palaivananathar Temple at Papanasam. It is believed that farmers in the region store their grains in the temple, which also accommodates contributions of the donors to the temple. There are shrines of Kodandarama, Hanuman and Krishna around the sanctum. The shrine of Ranganayagi has sculpted pillars made in Vijayanagara style. There is a huge foot of Vishnu is seen around the western side in the first precinct. In modern times, the temple is maintained and administered by the Hindu Religious and Charitable Endowments Department of the Government of Tamil Nadu.

Festivals and religious practices

The temple priests perform the pooja (rituals) during festivals and on a daily basis. As at other Vishnu temples of Tamil Nadu, the priests belong to the Vaishnavaite community, a Brahmin sub-caste. The temple rituals are performed six times a day: Ushathkalam at 7 a.m., Kalasanthi at 8:00 a.m., Uchikalam at 12:00 p.m., Sayarakshai at 6:00 p.m., Irandamkalam at 7:00 p.m. and Ardha Jamam at 10:00 p.m. Each ritual has three steps: alangaram (decoration), neivethanam (food offering) and deepa aradanai (waving of lamps) for both Ranganatha Perumal and Ranganayagi. During the last step of worship, nagaswaram (pipe instrument) and tavil (percussion instrument) are played, religious instructions in the Vedas (sacred text) are recited by priests, and worshippers prostrate themselves in front of the temple mast. There are weekly, monthly and fortnightly rituals performed in the temple. The image of the presiding deity is made of stucco and hence sacred ablutions are not performed for it. The temple follows Vaikasana Agama. The festivals associated with Vishnu like Vaikunta Ekadasi, Krishna Janmashtami, Ramanavami and Adi Pooram are celebrated in the temple. The prime temple festival, the Brahmotsavam, has been suspended for many years on account of poor patronage.

Religious significance
The temple is considered as Periya Perumal temple, meaning the image of presiding Ranganathar is larger than the one found at Ranganathar Temple at Srirangam. The temple finds mention in the Sanskrit work Skanda Purana. As per the temple records, the temple is believed to be older than the Ranganathaswamy temple at Srirangam and hence came to be known as Adhi Rangam, meaning the original Rangam. Following the legend of Moon gaining his sheen, the temple tank where Chandra obtained his sheen back is called Chandrapushkarani, otherwise the Thenpennai River. The Ranga Vimanam given to Vibhishana and was installed in Srirangam temple, is believed to have been formed naturally in this temple. The Ranga vimanam in the temple is in the form of Om, is believed to be an amalgamated form of Saivism. It is believed that Kedilam River was formed in the hill when Garuda scratched the hill with his beak.

References

External links

Hindu temples in Tiruvannamalai district
Purana temples of Vishnu